The 2015 West Devon Borough Council election took place on 7 May 2015, to elect members of West Devon Borough Council in England. This was on the same day as other local elections across England.

References

2015 English local elections
May 2015 events in the United Kingdom
2015
2010s in Devon